Zeki Velidi Togan (1890 – 1970 in Istanbul), was a Bashkir historian, Turkologist, and leader of the Bashkir revolutionary and liberation movement.

Biography

He was born in Kuzyanovo (Bashkir: Көҙән) village of Sterlitamaksky Uyezd, Ufa Governorate (in present-day Ishimbaysky District, Bashkortostan).

From 1912 to 1915 Velidi taught in the madrasa in Kazan (Qasímiä), and from 1915 to 1917, he was a member of bureau, supporting Muslim deputies at the State Duma. In 1917, he was elected to the Millät Mäclese, and with Şerif Manatov, he organized the Bashkir Shuro (Council). During the Bashkir Congress in Orenburg from December 1917, he declared autonomous Bashkiria. However, he was arrested 3 February 1918 by the Soviet forces. In April 1918 he managed to escape and joined the forces confronting the Bolsheviks. 

In 1918 and 1919 Velidi's Bashkir troops first fought under Ataman Alexander Dutov, then under Admiral Kolchak against Bolshevik forces. After the RSFSR promised autonomy to Bashkirs, Velidi switched allegiance, fighting with the Bolsheviks.

From February 1919 to June 1920, he was chairman of the Bashrevkom (Bashkir Revolutionary Committee). He attended the Congress of the Peoples of the East held in Baku in September 1920, where he became involved in drawing up the statutes of ERK, a Muslim Socialist organisation. However, feeling the Bolsheviks had broken their promises, he became more critical of them when he moved to Central Asia.

In Turkistan, Velidi became a leader of the Basmachi Movement. From 1920 to 1923, he was chairman of the "National Union of Turkistan". In 1923 Validi emigrated, after discovering original manuscripts of Ahmad ibn Fadlan in Iran.

From 1925 Velidi lived in Turkey and was appointed Chair of Turkish History at the Istanbul University in 1927. However, his controversial views criticizing the Turkish History Thesis at the First Turkish Language Congress in 1932, forced him to seek refuge in Vienna, where he gained a doctor of philosophy at the University of Vienna in 1935. Following he became a professor at Bonn University (1935–1937) and Göttingen University (1938–1939). On the 3 May 1944 protests in support of Nihal Atsız occurred, who was on trial and on the 9 May he was detained together with other Pan-Turkists like Alparslan Türkeş, Nihal Atsız and Reha Oğuz Türkkan. In March 1945 he was sentenced to 10 years of hard labor. During trial he was accused of having been the chair of Gürem, an organization aimed at forming a military alliance with Nazi Germany in order to liberate the Turkic people living in the Soviet Union. In 1947 a retrial ended with the release of all defendants. In 1953 he became organizer of the İslam Tetkikleri Enstitüsü (Institute for Islamic Studies) at Istanbul University. In 1967, he was given an honorary doctorate from the University of Manchester. At the same time he contributed to the Encyclopedia of Turkic Peoples. His articles about culture, language and history of Turkic peoples have been translated into many languages.

References

Further reading
 .
 .
 Z.V.Togan. MEMOIRES: Struggle for National and Cultural Independence of the Turkistan and other Moslem Eastern Turks
 Copeaux, Etienne (1993), « Le mouvement prométhéen », Cahiers d'études sur la Méditerranée orientale et le monde Turco-iranien (CEMOTI), 16: 9-45. https://www.persee.fr/doc/cemot_0764-9878_1993_num_16_1_1050
 Zeki Velidi Togan MEMOIRS: National Existence and Cultural Struggles of Turkistan and other Moslem Eastern Turks, 510 Pp.
 Zeki Velidi Togan MEMOIRS: National Existence and Cultural Struggles of Turkistan and other Moslem Eastern Turks---full text translated from the original
 Zaur Gasimov, « Transfer and Asymmetry », European Journal of Turkish Studies [Online], 24 | 2017, Online since 8 November 2017, connection on 17 November 2017. URL : http://ejts.revues.org/5432

External links

1890 births
1970 deaths
People from Ishimbaysky District
People from Sterlitamaksky Uyezd
Russian Constituent Assembly members
20th-century Turkish historians
Turkologists
Historians of Central Asia
Khazar studies
Pan-Turkists
Muslims from the Russian Empire
Turkish people of Bashkir descent
People of the Russian Civil War
Soviet emigrants to Turkey
Academic staff of the University of Bonn